The Shay Elliott Memorial race is a one-day road cycling race held in spring in Ireland. It is run in honour of Ireland's first professional cyclist, Seamus Shay Elliott. The race was previously known as the Route de Chill Mhantain ("Wicklow Route"), became the Shay Elliott Trophy in the late sixties, then the Shay Elliott Memorial after his death in 1971. The race is the most prestigious Irish one-day event after the national championships.

History
In 1958, the first Route de Chill Mhantáin was held, organised by Bray Wheelers, a cycling club from Bray, County Wicklow. It was devised by Joe Loughman, one of the main organisers of the club, who wanted to present a tough race over the Wicklow Mountains.  The Route de Chill Mhantáin was the first open massed-start race that Bray Wheelers had organised. The first edition was won by John Lackey. 

The race was renamed The Shay Elliott Memorial in later years. The trophy presented each year was won by Elliott himself as a prize for best amateur in France in 1955. Winners of the race include some of the best of Irish cycling, including two-time champion Sean Kelly (who was the only rider to have won the race while still a junior), former professional Peter Crinnion, two time Tour of Ireland winner Pat McQuaid, Peter Doyle (the first rider to win the Tour of Ireland and the Ras Tailteann) and Phil Cassidy (a two-time winner of the Ras Tailteann). In 2002 the race became an international race.

The 2015 edition of the race was won by former Track World Champion Martyn Irvine.

Format 
The open mass-start race begins in Bray, and finishes there too, after taking a loop that goes over the Wicklow Mountains, including the steep ascent of the Old Wicklow Gap, locally known as Croghan, as well as the Glenmalure climb where the Shay Elliott monument lies by the roadside.

Past winners

References

External links
 Official Website of the organisers of the Shay Elliot Memorial –Bray Wheelers

Cycle races in Ireland
Men's road bicycle races
Spring (season) events in the Republic of Ireland
Recurring sporting events established in 1958
1958 establishments in Ireland